Schizochiton is a genus of polyplacophoran molluscs. Schizochiton is known from Miocene fossils, as well as extant species.

Extant species
 Schizochiton incisus 
 Schizochiton jousseaumei

References 

Chiton genera
Prehistoric chiton genera